Anders Morelius (born 20 March 1940) is a Swedish orienteering competitor. He is Relay World Champion from 1966, as a member of the Swedish winning team in the very first World Orienteering Championships, held i  Fiskars, Finland. He also earned a bronze medal in the 1966 Individual World Orienteering Championship.
Han also won 10-mila representing OK Malmia in 1965.

References

1940 births
Living people
Swedish orienteers
Male orienteers
Foot orienteers
World Orienteering Championships medalists